Temple Christian School is a private Christian school in Titusville, Florida.

History 

Temple was founded in 1994 by Wendell Correll, pastor of Temple Baptist Church.

References

External links 

Christian schools in Florida
Private high schools in Florida
Buildings and structures in Titusville, Florida
High schools in Brevard County, Florida
Private middle schools in Florida
Private elementary schools in Florida